Sunset Country Club is a country club in Sunset Hills, Missouri, in south St. Louis County, Missouri.

The par-72 18-hole golf course designed by Robert and James Foulis was built in 1917. A master plan created by Dr. Michael Hurdzan has guided recent course renovations.

Tournaments hosted

Scorecard

Source:

References

External links

Official website

Golf clubs and courses in Missouri
1910 establishments in Missouri
Buildings and structures in St. Louis County, Missouri